Santa Cruz Airport  is an airport serving Puerto Santa Cruz, a town on the Santa Cruz River estuary in the Santa Cruz Province of  Argentina.

The Santa Cruz non-directional beacon (Ident: SCZ) is located on the field.

See also

Transport in Argentina
List of airports in Argentina

References

External links
OpenStreetMap - Santa Cruz Airport

Airports in Argentina